The Oak Ridges Moraine Conservation Act, officially known as the Oak Ridges Moraine Conservation Act, 2001, is a conservation plan for land situated on or near the Oak Ridges Moraine in Ontario, Canada. The legislation was enacted by the Government of Ontario in 2001.

The primary purpose of the legislation is to protect the ecological and hydrological integrity of the Oak Ridges Moraine. The legislation was passed by the Legislative Assembly of Ontario on 13 December 2001, and received royal assent the next day. The government also released the Oak Ridges Moraine Conservation Plan regulation, which defined land use and planning policies consistent with the Act, and assigned interim directors to the new Oak Ridges Moraine Foundation.

References

External links
Oak Ridges Moraine Conservation Plan
Land Use Planning at the Ministry of Municipal Affairs and Housing

Oak Ridges Moraine